"Don't Ever Change" is a 1961 popular song written by Gerry Goffin and Carole King. Intended for The Everly Brothers but rejected by their management, it is one of the Goffin-King team's lesser-known songs, although a version by The Crickets reached the top 5 in the United Kingdom (Jerry Naylor lead vocal). The Beatles performed the song on their BBC radio show Pop Go the Beatles, which was later released on their 1994 compilation Live at the BBC. It was taped on August 1, 1963, had its first broadcast on August 27, 1963, was produced by Terry Henebery and was a rare harmony duet between Paul McCartney and George Harrison. The song was also covered by Brinsley Schwarz on their Please Don't Ever Change album in 1973, by Bryan Ferry on his 1973 album These Foolish Things, and by Mud on their 1982 album Mud featuring Les Gray.

The Beatles personnel 
Paul McCartney – vocals, bass
George Harrison – vocals, lead guitar
John Lennon – rhythm guitar
Ringo Starr – drums
Personnel per The Beatles Bible.

Sources

Live at BBC notes

1961 singles
Songs with lyrics by Gerry Goffin
Songs written by Carole King
The Beatles songs
1961 songs
The Crickets songs